The 2010 GT4 European Cup season was the fourth season of the GT4 European Cup. It began on May 1 at Silverstone, before finishing on October 17 at Magny-Cours after twelve races held at six meetings.

Rhesus Racing driver and single-seater convert Paul Meijer finished the season as the main GT4 champion – as well as securing the GT4 teams title, with team-mates Giuseppe De Pasquale and Raffaele Sangiulio – having finished each of the twelve races to be held on the podium. Meijer won a season-high five races during the season, including winning both races at the season-opening meeting at Silverstone, en route to a championship-winning margin of 27 points over RS Williams' Michael Mallock. Mallock finished a comfortable second after Matt Nicoll-Jones elected not to contest the final round of the season at Magny-Cours; Mallock won three races, while Nicoll-Jones won two – a double at the Nürburgring, after guest driver Ollie Hancock was ineligible to score points for a victory – for IMS Motorsport. Jordan Tresson and Lucas Ordoñez shared fourth place despite not winning any races between him, with Alessandro Pier Guidi the only driver outside the top three drivers to win a race, winning both races at Le Castellet. Gianni Giudici won seven races to clinch the SuperSport class, ahead of four-time winner Anasthasios Ladas, who shared two of his wins with Kevin Veltman. Julian Griffin won the other race at the Nürburgring.

Entry list
The entry list for the first round was released on 27 April 2010.

Calendar
 A provisional calendar was released by the series on November 19, 2009.

Championship standings

Drivers' Championship

Teams' Championship

References

External links
 Official Website of the GT4 European Cup

GT4 European Series
GT4 European Cup
GT4 European Cup